Loyola Blakefield is a private Catholic, college preparatory school run by the USA East Province of the Society of Jesus in Towson, Maryland and within the Archdiocese of Baltimore. It was established in 1852 by the Jesuits as an all-boys school for students from Baltimore, Baltimore County, Harford County, Carroll County, Howard County, Anne Arundel County, and Southern Pennsylvania. It enrolls over 900 students in grades six through twelve. The school was originally called Loyola High School    when it was established in 1852. The name change occurred when it added a middle school.

History 
Irish-American Archbishop Francis Kenrick asked the Jesuits to oversee the formation of a school for laymen that would incorporate the Jesuit standards of excellence and build new men conscious of a religious purpose. His request was prompted by the 1852 closure of nearby St. Mary's College. Construction of Loyola High School began on Holliday Street in Baltimore, Maryland, in early 1852, and on September 15, 1852, the school enrolled its first students. Irish-American Rev. John Early, S.J. and eight other Jesuits are credited with the founding of the Loyola. Loyola operated as a component of Loyola University Maryland until its separation in 1921.

In the early 1930s the growing and cramped high school began to look toward moving north of the city. In 1933, with the support of the Blake family, Loyola purchased the land known today as Blakefield in Towson, Maryland. In 1941, the downtown campus officially closed. Between 1981 and 1988, a Middle School was gradually introduced, and in recognition of the two levels of education, Loyola High School officially became known as Loyola Blakefield. Kenneth Montague became the first African-American student at Loyola in 1956.

Physical improvements in recent years have included the construction of Knott Hall which houses the student commons and dining hall, athletic center, and alumni areas, Burk Hall academic wing, renovations to the 60-year-old science laboratories, construction of St. Ignatius Hall, and construction of an additional section to Wheeler Hall.

Loyola Blakefield has a tradition of honoring alumni from 50 years earlier at its graduation ceremony. "Bring back the men from 50 years before to see a new generation graduate," writes James Maliszewski, whose grandfather died a year before they could have attended together as 1937 and 1987 graduates.

Athletics
Loyola Blakefield competes in the Maryland Interscholastic Athletic Association (MIAA) for all interscholastic sports. In addition to the MIAA, the basketball team is also a member of the Baltimore Catholic League.

Football
The football program won seven conference championships. The Loyola Blakefield football team plays every Thanksgiving Day in one of the oldest continual national Catholic high school football rivalries, against cross-town rival Calvert Hall College. The game, known as the Turkey Bowl, is held at M&T Bank Stadium in Baltimore and broadcast on television and radio by WMAR-TV.

Lacrosse
The Loyola lacrosse program is among its most successful. It has won a total of 14 championships, including 8 in the 1980s and victories in 2001, 2007, 2008, and 2013. In 2007, they defeated Boys' Latin 10–6 in the MIAA championship game. In 2008, they defeated previously undefeated Gilman 12–11 in the championship game at Towson University's Johnny Unitas Stadium before over 8,000 spectators. Loyola has produced numerous players who have continued on to play collegiate lacrosse, including National Lacrosse Hall of Famer John Stewart.

Baseball
Loyola's baseball team won the MIAA "A" Conference title in 2017, its first in 71 years. It has produced Major League baseball players including current Baltimore Oriole, Bruce Zimmermann and Tim Nordbrook.

Swimming
Loyola's swimming and diving team has also achieved success, having recorded a record run of 20 Maryland Interscholastic Athletic Association state titles in 21 years and six National Catholic Swimming Championships crowns, whilst consistently being ranked within the National Interscholastic Swim Coaches Association national Top-25 Poll for best high school swimming teams.

Soccer
The soccer program won the Maryland Championship in 2001, 2012, and 2014 and has produced Division I talent. Coach Lee Tschantret, a former longtime player in the Major Indoor Soccer League, won several championships with the Baltimore Blast. The program has produced several professional players including Akira Fitzgerald, Grant Robinson, and Avionne Flanagan.

Basketball
The Loyola basketball program reached regional prominence in the 1970s when it was led by head coach Jerry Savage, who won over 600 games from 1969 to 2003. He produced several Division I players.  Savage also coached the 1997 MIAA Championship team, the last championship of any sort for the Dons basketball program. Loyola has been in the most Baltimore Catholic League finals with 13 total and 6 championships. More recently, the program had several disappointing seasons and experienced a four-year period with four different head coaches.  Since then Josh Davalli, an All-Metro player at Cardinal Gibbons in the mid-1990s, served as varsity head coach while also teaching in the Middle School.

Cross Country
The Loyola cross-country program has had much success, being the first and only team in the MIAA to complete the "three-peat", then continuing to win six consecutive individual and team titles at the Maryland Interscholastic Athletic Association championship meet. Under the coaching of Jose Albornoz and Chris Cucuzzella, the Dons have won 17 MIAA/MSA championships to bring the program's total championships to 18 (1983,1989,1991,1997–98, 2000, 2003, 2005–06, 2009–14, 2017–18, and 2021) since its inception.

Rugby
The Loyola Dons have won the Rugby MIAA Championship a total of nine times: 2008–2010, 2013, 2015–2016, 2018, and 2021–2022. The rugby program has been ranked among the top 50 high schools in the nation.

Notable alumni

Journalism and entertainment
 Tom Clancy, author
 Ambassador Nathaniel Fick, former United States Marine Corps captain, author of One Bullet Away: The Making of a Marine Officer, and US Ambassador at Large for Cyberspace and Digital Policy
 Brendan Hines, actor in Fox Broadcasting Company's series Lie to Me
 Aaron LaCrate, music producer and fashion designer
 Jim McKay, Emmy-winning Olympic sports broadcaster and host of the Wide World of Sports
 Thomas F. Monteleone, author

Catholicism
 George Coyne, astronomer and Director of the Vatican Observatory
 James Cardinal Stafford, Apostolic Penitentiary, former President of the Pontifical Council for the Laity and former Archbishop of Denver

Athletes and athletics
 Akira Fitzgerald, USL League One player for the Richmond Kickers
 Terence Garvin, former National Football League player
 Jason La Canfora, NFL Network analyst
 Mike Lookingland, former Major Arena Soccer League player
 Bruce McGonnigal, former National Football League player
 Tim Nordbrook, former Major League Baseball player
 Ben Rubeor, former Major League Lacrosse player, Head Coach of the Atlas Lacrosse Club of the Premier Lacrosse League
 Bill Stromberg, College Football Hall of Fame wide receiver and chief executive officer of T. Rowe Price
 Steele Stanwick, Major League Lacrosse player for the Chesapeake Bayhawks, recipient of the Tewaaraton Award
 Wes Unseld Jr., National Basketball Association coach, son of Basketball Hall of Fame member Wes Unseld
 Bob Williams, former National Football League player
 Bruce Zimmermann, Major League Baseball player for the Baltimore Orioles

Notable Maryland alumni
 Ephraim Francis Baldwin, architect for B&O Railroad
 J. Joseph Curran, Jr., former Attorney General of Maryland
 Thomas L. J. D'Alesandro III, former Mayor of Baltimore and brother of Speaker of the U.S. House of Representatives Nancy Pelosi
 Carl Stokes, member of the Baltimore City Council
 James T. Smith Jr., Maryland Secretary of Transportation
 Bruce Zimmermann, pitcher for the Baltimore Orioles

Science and technology
 George L. Drusano, physician and medical researcher
 Bradley M. Kuhn, computer scientist and free software activist

See also
List of Jesuit secondary schools in the United States
Loyola University Maryland
National Catholic Educational Association
Parochial school

References

External links
Jesuit Secondary Education Association
Loyola Blakefield Homepage
Roman Catholic Archdiocese of Baltimore

Boys' schools in Maryland
Catholic secondary schools in Maryland
Educational institutions established in 1852
Jesuit high schools in the United States
Private schools in Baltimore County, Maryland
Private middle schools in Maryland
Buildings and structures in Baltimore County, Maryland
1852 establishments in Maryland